The AWA World Women's Championship was the women's professional wrestling title in the American Wrestling Association from 1961 until 1990.

Title history

Combined reigns

Notes

References

External links 
 AWA World Women's Title History

American Wrestling Association championships
World professional wrestling championships
Women's professional wrestling championships